The 1965 All-Africa Games was the First Edition of the African Games where Volleyball was contested, but only for men and it was held in Brazzaville, Republic of the Congo, with Eight national teams has participated.

Teams

Final ranking

References

Volleyball at the African Games
Volleyball, Men
African Games, Men
1965 in African sport